The Chüy Valley is a large valley located in northern Kyrgyzstan and southern Kazakhstan, in the northern part of the Tian Shan. It extends from Boom Gorge in the east to Muyunkum Desert in the west. It borders Kyrgyz Ala-Too in the south, and Chu-Ili mountains in the north. Through the Boom Gorge in the narrow eastern part Chüy Valley is linked with Issyk-Kul Valley. The river Chu (Chüy) is the major stream of the valley.

The warm summer and availability of drinking and irrigation water makes this area one of the most fertile and most densely populated regions of Kyrgyzstan.

There are deposits of zinc ore, lead, gold, and construction materials. The 2006 World Drug Report estimated that 400,000 hectares of cannabis grow wild in the Chüy Valley.

Climate
The climate is sharply continental. Summers are long and hot, and winters are relatively short and cold. Precipitation progressively increases with increasing altitude near Kyrgyz Ala-Too range. Spring and autumn are the rainiest seasons in Chüy Valley.

Settlements

The following cities and towns are located in the Chüy Valley:
 Bishkek
 Kara-Balta
 Kant
 Kemin
 Shopokov
 Tokmok
 Ivanovka

References

Valleys of Kyrgyzstan
Valleys of Kazakhstan
Chüy Region
Jambyl Region